Tiptur is a city in the southern part of the state of Karnataka, India. It is the second largest and the fastest growing city in  Tumkur district. It is a sub-divisional headquarters of Tumkur district in Karnataka. Capital city Bengaluru is 140 km from Tiptur.  Tiptur city is known for its coconut plantations.

Etymology
Tiptur is said to have got its name from "tipatala", the word for "copra" in the local language, Kannada. The name was probably derived from the industry which produces dried coconut in the areas surrounding the city.

History 
Tiptur was historically a part of Honnavalli, a village headquarters located 11 miles northwest of Tiptur in Tumkur district. Honnavalli was the taluk headquarters until 1886. The history of the village dates back to eleventh century . It was built by the king Someswara Raaya, who belonged to the Harnahalli Nayak dynasty. Legend has it that Honnu Amma, the family deity of the Paalegaar, appeared in a dream and directed him to build a model village in her name. Even today 'Honnavalli Amma' is the village goddess.

Tiptur Lok Sabha constituency was a former Lok Sabha constituency in Mysore State (Karnataka from 1957 to 1967). This seat came into existence in 1957 and ceased to exist in 1966, before 1967 Lok Sabha Elections. This constituency was later merged with Tumkur Lok Sabha constituency.

Geography 
Tiptur has been surrounded by from the west side Arsikere and channarayapatna. from the east side Chikkanayakana halli, Gubbi, Turuvekere. It lies on the Bangalore-Miraj railway line.

Fauna 
Mammalian fauna in the region includes Indian grey mongoose, wild boar, golden jackal and the occasional sloth bear. Reports of leopards have also been known in the surrounding region; and a single grey slender loris has been sighted in the Kalpataru College in 2016. Avifauna includes passerines such as bulbuls, sunbirds and flamebacks and larger birds such as the woolly-necked stork and winter visitors such as bar-headed geese. The peacock is very common in the region.

Education
There are a number of government, aided and private educational institutions which offer courses including in Pre-university courses, degrees, master's degrees and other technical courses.
Government Boys College and High school
Government Girls College and High School
Daffodils Primiry and higher primiry School
Nalanda School
Tagore Education Society 
Sri Udaya Bharathi Educational and Charitable Institutions
Basaveshwara College of Education, Tiptur
Kalpataru vidya samste,Tiptur
Kalpataru College of Education, Tiptur
SPS DEd College Rangapura, Tiptur
Gurukula vidya samste
Sree Jagadguru Siddamallarya Teachers Training Institute, Tiptur
Sri Basaveshwara DEd College, Tiptur
Sri Siddhartha DEd College, Tiptur

Economy
Tiptur has an Agricultural Produce Market Committee (APMC) market. Auctions are held every Wednesday and Saturday. Farmers from nearby taluks and villages and even as far as Channarayapatna KR Pete Nagamangala BellurCross, Hirisaave, Turuvekere Arsikere ChikkanayakanaHalli Gubbi Kadur Banavara Huliyar towns carry their copra produce to the market for auction. Several copra desiccated powder industries in and around Tiptur export their products to different parts of India and the world. Traders from Tiptur supply copra throughout the world.
with this many silk firms is also there where they produce silk sarees. two big garments is there which gives more number of employment for the people. Many small scall industries is also present which countributs to the economy of the city.

Civic administration
The Tiptur City Municipal Council (CMC) comprises 31 wards, with a councillor for each ward. The CMC covers an area of 11.6 km2. In the Tiptur CMC, the sex ratio of female personnel is 988, higher than the average in Karnataka state, which is 973..  Tiptur city has JMFC court complex.
There is 4 hoblis in the tiptur taluk Kasaba, Honnavalli, Nonavinakere, KB cross.

Transport

By road
Tiptur is well connected by road routes. Both KSRTC and private bus service is available connecting with major cities of the State including Bangalore, Shivamogga, Hassan, Chikkamagalur, Tumkur, Davanagere, Ballari, Chitradurga.

By rail
Tiptur has its own two railway station in its limits (Tiptur, Sri Sharadha Nagar) with connections to Bangalore,Shivamogga,Chikkamagalur,hubbli and other places.

Notable people
Narasimharaju - Kannada actor, known for comic roles. 
Umashree - popular Kannada actress and politician
Achyuth Kumar - Actor
Raja Ramanna - Nuclear scientist, Supervised Pokhran Nuclear Tests of 1974

References

Cities and towns in Tumkur district